Tyler James Bagley (born June 2, 1999) is an American professional soccer player who plays as an attacking midfielder for Las Vegas Lights in the USL Championship.

Career

Youth & College
Bagley attended San Clemente High School, whilst also playing club soccer for U.S. Soccer Development Academy side Irvine Strikers.

In 2017, Bagley attended Cornell University to play college soccer. In five years with Big Red, including a cancelled 2020 season due to the COVID-19 pandemic, Bagley made 65 appearances, scoring 17 goals and tallying 15 assists. In 2021, he was named first-team All-Ivy League and first-team Northeast all-region.

While at college, Bagley also played in the National Premier Soccer League with Rochester Lancers in 2019, making eight appearances and scoring a single goal. In 2021, he was part of the Boston Bolts team competing in the USL League Two, scoring 12 goals in as many regular season games, getting named to the 2021 USL2 All-League Team of the Year.

Professional
On January 11, 2022, Bagley was selected 54th overall in the 2022 MLS SuperDraft by Inter Miami CF. On February 24, 2022, he was named to the club's MLS Next Pro roster for the 2022 season. In his debut professional season, he scored two goals in 15 appearances for Inter Miami II.

On February 28, 2023, Bagley signed with USL Championship side Las Vegas Lights.

References

External links

 

1999 births
Living people
American soccer players
Association football midfielders
Boston Bolts players
Cornell Big Red men's soccer players
Inter Miami CF II players
Inter Miami CF draft picks
Las Vegas Lights FC players
MLS Next Pro players
National Premier Soccer League players
People from San Clemente, California
Soccer players from California
USL League Two players